The Jackson Purchase, also known as the Purchase Region or simply the Purchase, is a region in the U.S. state of Kentucky bounded by the Mississippi River to the west, the Ohio River to the north, and the Tennessee River to the east. 

Jackson's Purchase also included all of Tennessee west of the Tennessee River. However, in modern usage the term refers only to the Kentucky portion of the Jackson Purchase. The southern portion is simply called West Tennessee.

Geography
The Purchase comprised what is now eight counties, with a combined land area of 3,394.8 square miles (6,202.5 km²), about 6.03 percent of Kentucky's land area. Its 2010 census population was 196,365 inhabitants, equal to 4.53 percent of the state's population. Paducah, the largest city and main economic center, has just over 25,000 residents. The region's other two largest cities, Murray and Mayfield, have about 18,000 and 10,000 residents respectively. The main educational institution is Murray State University.

Counties
 Ballard County
 Calloway County
 Carlisle County
 Fulton County
 Graves County
 Hickman County
 Marshall County
 McCracken County

Economy
Though chiefly an agricultural economy, tourism is an important industry in the Purchase, focused chiefly on water-related activities at the TVA-created Kentucky Lake.  Together with the portion of the Tennessee River north of Kentucky Dam, it forms the eastern border of the Purchase.

History

Although claimed as part of Kentucky at its statehood in 1792, the land did not come under definitive U.S. control until 1818, when General Andrew Jackson and ex-Kentucky governor Isaac Shelby, representing the United States federal government, purchased it from the Chickasaw Indians through several treaties, including the Treaty of Tuscaloosa.

Historically, this region has been considered the most "Southern" of Kentucky; having an agricultural economy tied to cotton plantations and the use of enslaved labor before the Civil War, the Purchase in the years after the war voted as the most staunchly Democratic region in Kentucky. For well over a century, it provided such overwhelming margins for Democratic candidates that Kentucky Democrats routinely called it the "Gibraltar of Democracy".  The most widely circulated newspaper and media outlet in the Purchase, The Paducah Sun, was once named the Paducah Sun-Democrat (see WPSD-TV). Due to changing demographics, most counties in the Purchase in the early 21st century have populations that are overwhelmingly white. Many African Americans left the area after the Civil War and in the Great Migration of the 20th century.

During the Civil War, the Purchase was the area of strongest support for the Confederate cause. On May 29, 1861, a group of Southern sympathizers from Kentucky and Tennessee met at the Graves County Courthouse in Mayfield to discuss the possibility of aligning the Purchase with West Tennessee. Most records of the event were lost, possibly in an 1864 fire that destroyed the courthouse. After the War the region heightened its sense of being "Southern".

In 1907, Fulton County judge Herbert Carr declared in a speech that the Mayfield Convention adopted a resolution for secession, and a historical marker in front of the courthouse also proclaims this as fact. But, the surviving records of the meeting, authored by a Union sympathizer, make no mention of this resolution. Historian Berry Craig states that the convention believed the whole of Kentucky would eventually secede and make unnecessary a separate resolution for the Purchase to break away.

Records do show that the convention adopted resolutions condemning President Abraham Lincoln for "waging a bloody and cruel war" against the South, urging Governor Beriah Magoffin to resist Union forces and praising him for refusing to answer Lincoln's call for soldiers, and condemning the provision of "Lincoln guns" to Union sympathizers in Kentucky. The convention nominated Henry Burnett to represent Kentucky's First District in Congress. The Mayfield Convention was a precursor to the later Russellville Convention, that formed the provisional Confederate government of Kentucky.

Since the late 20th century, the Purchase has voted for Republicans in national elections while giving higher percentages to candidates of the Democratic Party in state and local elections. This trend is similar to realignment among white conservatives in other parts of the South. , however, the region's delegation in the Kentucky General Assembly included both Republican Party and Democratic Party representatives. For the first time in history, that year the region elected Republicans for both of its two state senators.

The Purchase is within Kentucky's 1st congressional district. , 67% of all Purchase voters are registered Democrats and 27% of Purchase voters are registered Republicans. In keeping with the South generally, Purchase Democrats are more conservative than many in the national party. (see also Blue Dog Democrats).

Notable people
Notable people from the region include:
 Alben W. Barkley, Vice President of the United States, 1949-1953, United States Senate Majority Leader, represented Kentucky in the U.S. Senate, 1927-1949 and 1955-1956, represented the First District in the United States House of Representatives, 1913-1927
 Julian Carroll, Lieutenant Governor of Kentucky, 1971-1974, and 54th Governor of Kentucky, 1974-1979
 Steven Curtis Chapman, Christian music artist
 Irvin Cobb, humorist and author
 Jackie DeShannon, singer/songwriter
 Steve Finley, major league baseball player, 1989-2007
 Joe Fulks, basketball player
 Noble Jones Gregory, represented the First District in the United States House of Representatives, 1937-1958
 William Voris Gregory, represented the First District in the United States House of Representatives, 1927-1936
 Robert H. Grubbs, Nobel Prize winner in Chemistry, 2005
 Carroll Hubbard, represented the First District in the United States House of Representatives, 1975-1992
 Frank Stubblefield, represented the First District in the United States House of Representatives, 1959-1974
 Lloyd Tilghman, Confederate general
 Harry Lee Waterfield, Lieutenant Governor of Kentucky, 1955–1959 and 1963–1967

References

Further reading
 Clark, Thomas D. "The Jackson Purchase: A Dramatic Chapter in Southern Indian Policy and Relations." Filson Club Historical Quarterly 50 (1976): 302-20.
 Davis, Darrell Haug. Geography of the Jackson Purchase (Kentucky Geological Society, 1923).
 Hoskins, Patricia. "'The Old First is With the South:' The Civil War, Reconstruction, and Memory in the Jackson Purchase Region of Kentucky." (PhD Auburn University 2009) online  bibliography pp 296–315.
 Whitesell, Hunter B. "Military Operations in the Jackson Purchase Areas of Kentucky, 1862-1865," Register of the Kentucky Historical Society 63 (April 1965): 141-167.

External links
 Jackson Purchase Historical Society

Regions of Kentucky
History of Kentucky
History of United States expansionism
Andrew Jackson
1818 in the United States
1818 in Kentucky